Samoan may refer to:
 Something of, from, or related to the Samoan Islands, an archipelago in the South Pacific Ocean
 Something of, from, or related to Samoa, a country encompassing the western part of the Samoan Islands
 Something of, from, or related to American Samoa, a United States territory in the Samoan Islands
 Samoan language, the native language of the Samoan Islands
 Samoans, a Polynesian ethnic group of the Samoan Islands

Language and nationality disambiguation pages